Sam Jones (born 11 November 1997) is an English ice hockey player for Sheffield Steelers and the British national team. His family, including elder brother Adam who also became a high-level hockey player, moved to Canada in the mid-2000s.

He represented Great Britain at the 2021 IIHF World Championship and 2022 IIHF World Championship.

References

External links

1997 births
Living people
Canadian ice hockey defencemen
Cowichan Valley Capitals players
English ice hockey defencemen
English emigrants to Canada
Fife Flyers players
Milton Keynes Lightning players
Penticton Vees players
Sheffield Steelers players
Sportspeople from Walsall
Swindon Wildcats players